Fomepizole, also known as 4-methylpyrazole, is a medication used to treat methanol and ethylene glycol poisoning. It may be used alone or together with hemodialysis. It is given by injection into a vein.

Common side effects include headache, nausea, sleepiness, and unsteadiness. It is unclear if use during pregnancy causes risk to a fetus. Fomepizole works by blocking the enzyme that converts methanol and ethylene glycol to their toxic breakdown products.

Fomepizole was approved for medical use in the United States in 1997. It is on the World Health Organization's List of Essential Medicines.

Medical use
Fomepizole is used to treat ethylene glycol and methanol poisoning. It acts to inhibit the breakdown of these toxins into their active toxic metabolites. Fomepizole is a competitive inhibitor of the enzyme alcohol dehydrogenase, found in the liver. This enzyme plays a key role in the metabolism of ethylene glycol, and of methanol.
 Ethylene glycol is first metabolized to glycolaldehyde by alcohol dehydrogenase. Glycolaldehyde then undergoes further oxidation to glycolate, glyoxylate, and oxalate. Glycolate and oxalate are the primary toxins responsible for the metabolic acidosis, and for the renal damage, seen in ethylene glycol poisoning.
 Methanol is first metabolized to formaldehyde by alcohol dehydrogenase. Formaldehyde then undergoes further oxidation, via formaldehyde dehydrogenase, to become formic acid. Formic acid is the primary toxin responsible for the metabolic acidosis, and for the visual disturbances, associated with methanol poisoning.

By competitively inhibiting the first enzyme, alcohol dehydrogenase, in the metabolism of ethylene glycol and  methanol, fomepizole slows the production of the toxic metabolites. The slower rate of metabolite production allows the liver to process and excrete the metabolites as they are produced, limiting the accumulation in tissues such as the kidney and eye. As a result, much of the organ damage is avoided.

Fomepizole is most effective when given soon after ingestion of ethylene glycol or methanol. Delaying its administration allows for the generation of harmful metabolites.

Interaction with alcohol
Concurrent use with ethanol is contraindicated because fomepizole is known to prolong the half-life of ethanol via inhibiting its metabolism. Extending the half-life of ethanol may increase and extend the intoxicating effects of ethanol, allowing for greater (potentially dangerous) levels of intoxication at lower doses. Fomepizole slows the production of acetaldehyde by inhibiting alcohol dehydrogenase, which in turn allows more time to further convert acetaldehyde into acetic acid by acetaldehyde dehydrogenase. The result is a patient with a prolonged and deeper level of intoxication for any given dose of ethanol, and reduced "hangover" symptoms (since these adverse symptoms are largely mediated by acetaldehyde build up).

In a chronic alcoholic who has built up a tolerance to ethanol, this removes some of the disincentives to ethanol consumption ("negative reinforcement") while allowing them to become intoxicated with a lower dose of ethanol. The danger is that the alcoholic will then overdose on ethanol (possibly fatally). If alcoholics instead very carefully reduce their doses to reflect the now slower metabolism, they may get the "rewarding" stimulus of intoxication at lower doses with less adverse "hangover" effects - leading potentially to increased psychological dependency. However, these lower doses may therefore produce less chronic toxicity and provide a harm minimization approach to chronic alcoholism.

It is, in essence, the antithesis of a disulfiram approach which tries to increase the buildup of acetaldehyde resulting in positive punishment for the patient. Compliance, and adherence, is a substantial problem in disulfiram-based approaches. Disulfiram also has a considerably longer half-life than that of fomepizole, requiring the person to not drink ethanol in order to avoid severe effects. If the person is not adequately managed on a benzodiazepine, barbiturate, acamprosate, or another GABAA receptor agonist, the alcohol withdrawal syndrome, and its attendant, life-threatening risk of delirium tremens "DT", may occur. Disulfiram treatment should never be initiated until the risk of DT has been evaluated, and mitigated appropriately. Fomepizole treatment may be initiated while the DT de-titration sequence is still being calibrated based upon the person's withdrawal symptoms and psychological health.

Adverse effects
Common side effects associated with fomepizole use include headache and nausea.

Kinetics

Absorption and distribution
Fomepizole distributes rapidly into total body water. The volume of distribution is between 0.6 and 1.02 L/kg. The therapeutic concentration is from 8.2 to 24.6 mg (100 to 300 micromoles) per liter. Peak concentration following single oral doses of 7 to 50 mg/kg of body weight occurred in 1 to 2 hours. The half-life varies with dose, so has not been calculated.

Metabolism and elimination
Hepatic; the primary metabolite is 4-carboxypyrazole (about 80 to 85% of an administered dose). Other metabolites include the pyrazoles 4-hydroxymethylpyrazole and the N -glucuronide conjugates of 4-carboxypyrazole and 4-hydroxymethylpyrazole.

Following multiple doses, fomepizole rapidly induces its own metabolism via the cytochrome P450 mixed-function oxidase system.

In healthy volunteers, 1.0 to 3.5% of an administered dose was excreted unchanged in the urine. The metabolites also are excreted unchanged in the urine.

Fomepizole is dialyzable.

Other uses
Apart from medical uses, the role of 4-methylpyrazole in coordination chemistry has been studied.

See also
 Alcohol (medicine)
 Disulfiram-like drug

References

External links 
 

Alcohol dehydrogenase inhibitors
Antidotes
Pyrazoles
World Health Organization essential medicines
Wikipedia medicine articles ready to translate